Armenia participated in the Junior Eurovision Song Contest 2016 which took place on 20 November 2016, in Valletta, Malta. The Armenian broadcaster Armenian Public Television (ARMTV) was responsible for organising their entry for the contest. Anahit Adamyan and Mary Vardanyan were internally selected to represent Armenia with the song "Tarber".

Background

Prior to the 2016 Contest, Armenia had participated in the Junior Eurovision Song Contest nine times since its first entry in 2007, with their best result being in  when they won with the song "Mama", performed by Vladimir Arzumanyan. Armenia went on to host the Junior Eurovision Song Contest 2011, in the Armenian capital, Yerevan.

Before Junior Eurovision

The Armenian broadcaster announced on 21 July 2016, that they would be participating at the contest being held in Valletta, Malta on 20 November 2016. ARMTV announced on 10 August 2016 that they had internally selected Anahit Adamyan and Mary Vardanyan to represent them at the contest. Their song for the contest, "Tarber", was released on 28 October 2016.

Artist and song information

Anahit Adamyan and Mary Vardanyan
Anahit was born in Sochi, Russia in summer 2003 but has a very strong connection to her motherland, Armenia. Anahit started singing when she was just 4 years old. Her professional career started in 2013, when she participated in the auditions of Russia's The Voice Kids competition. Later Anahit took part in world-famous composer Igor Krutoy's "The battle of talents" show where she became one of the three finalists. Anahit's biggest dream was to be a part of the Eurovision family, and this year her dream is coming true!

Mary was born in April 2003 in Vardenis. She took her first steps into music back in 2011, when she started studying music at the Do-Re-Mi vocal school. She has participated in numerous music competitions, including the Renaissance International Music Festival, where she took the grand prix and the Friendship of Nations music competition, where she took first place.

Tarber
"Tarber" (Armenian: Տարբեր; English translation: "Different") is a song by Armenian teen singers Anahit Adamyan and Mary Vardanyan. It will represent Armenia during the Junior Eurovision Song Contest 2016. It is composed and written by Nick Egibyan and Avet Barseghyan, and produced by Anush Hovnanyan.

At Junior Eurovision
During the opening ceremony and the running order draw which took place on 14 November 2016, Armenia was drawn to perform second on 20 November 2015, following Ireland and preceding Albania.

The final was broadcast in Armenia on Armenia 1.

Final
Anahit and Mary were joined by a backstage group of four girls who were dancing around the duo throughout the whole performance of "Tarber".

Voting
During the press conference for the Junior Eurovision Song Contest 2016, held in Stockholm, the Reference Group announced several changes to the voting format for the 2016 contest. Previously, points had been awarded based on a combination of 50% National juries and 50% televoting, with one more set of points also given out by a 'Kids' Jury'. For the first time since the inauguration of the contest the voting procedure will not include a public televote. Following these results, three expert jurors will also announce their points from 1–8, 10, and 12. These professional jurors are: Christer Björkman, Mads Grimstad, and Jedward.

References

Junior Eurovision Song Contest
Armenia
2016